Tivadar is a Hungarian masculine given name. It is a cognate of the English language Theodore.

Notable people named Tivadar
Tivadar Alconiere (1797–1865), Austro-Hungarian painter
Tivadar Andrássy (1857–1905), Hungarian politician, painter, and art collector
Tivadar Batthyány (1859–1931), Hungarian politician
Tivadar Csontváry Kosztka (1853–1919), Hungarian painter
Tivadar Farkasházy (born 1945), Hungarian humorist, author, and journalist
Tivadar Filótás (1903–1945), Hungarian modern pentathlete
Tivadar Kanizsa (1933–1975), Hungarian water polo player
Tivadar Kardos (1921–1998), Hungarian chess composer and an author
Tivadar Millner (1899–1988), Hungarian chemical engineer, inventor, and educator
Tivadar Monostori (1936–2014), Hungarian footballer
Tivadar Nachéz (1859–1930), Hungarian violinist and composer
Tivadar Pauler (1816–1886), Hungarian politician and educator
Tivadar Puskás (1844–1893), Hungarian inventor, electrical engineer, and telephone pioneer
Tivadar Puskás (born 1952), Hungarian physician
Tivadar Soros (1893–1968), Hungarian lawyer, author, editor, and father of George and Paul Soros
Tivadar Tulassay (born 1949) Hungarian pediatrician, nephrologist, and educator
Tivadar Uray (1895–1962), Hungarian actor
Tivadar Zemplényi (1864–1917), Hungarian painter

References

Hungarian masculine given names